Zoran Kvržić (born 7 August 1988) is a Bosnian professional footballer who plays as a right-back for Croatian Football League club Šibenik.

Kvržić started his professional career at Proleter Teslić, before joining HAŠK in 2009. The following year, he switched to Osijek. In 2013, he was transferred to Rijeka, who loaned him to Spezia in 2015 and to Sheriff Tiraspol in 2016. Kvržić signed with Kayserispor in 2020. In 2021, he moved to Slaven Belupo. Two years later, he joined Šibenik.

Kvržić made his senior international debut for Bosnia and Herzegovina in 2011, earning 8 caps until 2020.

Club career

Early career
Kvržić started playing football at a local club, before joining youth setup of his hometown club Proleter Teslić. He made his professional debut in 2005 at the age of 17.

In February 2009, he moved to Croatian side HAŠK.

In July 2010, he switched to Osijek.

Rijeka
In February 2013, Rijeka announced that Kvržić would join them the following season on a four-year deal. He made his official debut for the team against Istra 1961 on 12 July. On 21 July, he scored his first goal for Rijeka against Hajduk Split. He won his first trophy with the club on 13 May 2014, by beating Dinamo Zagreb in Croatian Cup final.

In January 2015, Kvržić was sent on a six-month loan to Italian outfit Spezia. In July, his loan was extended for an additional season.

In July 2016, he was loaned to Moldovan side Sheriff Tiraspol until the end of season.

He signed a new three-year contract with Rijeka in November 2017.

Kvržić played his 100th game for the club against Cibalia on 26 November.

In September 2019, he extended his deal until June 2022.

Kayserispor
In January 2020, Kvržić was transferred to Turkish outfit Kayserispor for an undisclosed fee. He was sent off on his official debut for the side on 18 January against Alanyaspor. On 13 September, he scored his first goal for Kayserispor against Kasımpaşa, which secured the victory for his team.

Later stage of career
In October, Kvržić signed with Slaven Belupo.

In February 2023, he moved to Šibenik.

International career
In December 2011, Kvržić received his first senior call-up to Bosnia and Herzegovina, for a friendly game against Poland, and debuted in that game on 16 December.

Career statistics

Club

International

Honours
Rijeka
Croatian Cup: 2013–14, 2018–19
Croatian Super Cup: 2014

Sheriff Tiraspol
Moldovan Super Liga: 2016–17
Moldovan Cup: 2016–17
Moldovan Super Cup: 2016

References

External links

1988 births
Living people
People from Teslić
Croats of Bosnia and Herzegovina
Bosnia and Herzegovina footballers
Bosnia and Herzegovina international footballers
Bosnia and Herzegovina expatriate footballers
Association football fullbacks
FK Proleter Teslić players
NK HAŠK players
NK Osijek players
HNK Rijeka players
Spezia Calcio players
FC Sheriff Tiraspol players
Kayserispor footballers
NK Slaven Belupo players
HNK Šibenik players
First League of the Republika Srpska players
Second Football League (Croatia) players
Croatian Football League players
Serie B players
Moldovan Super Liga players
Süper Lig players
Expatriate footballers in Croatia
Expatriate footballers in Italy
Expatriate footballers in Moldova
Expatriate footballers in Turkey
Bosnia and Herzegovina expatriate sportspeople in Croatia
Bosnia and Herzegovina expatriate sportspeople in Italy
Bosnia and Herzegovina expatriate sportspeople in Moldova
Bosnia and Herzegovina expatriate sportspeople in Turkey